Deadly Skies may refer to:

 Deadly Skies (series), the European name for the Airforce Delta video game series
Deadly Skies (1999 video game), the first video game in the series
Deadly Skies (2001 video game), the second video game in the series
 Deadly Skies (film), a 2006 science-fiction film